Ratangad is a fort in Ratanwadi, Maharashtra, India, overlooking the locale of Bhandardara, one of the oldest artificial catchment area. This fort is located in the Ahmadnagar district of Maharashtra. It is on the boundary of Ahmadnagar and Thane districts. The fort is about 400 years old. This fort is often covered with flowering plants in November. Ratangad is also called Jewel of the Sahyadris.

Places to see
Ratangad has a natural rock peak with a cavity in it at the top which is called 'Nedhe' or 'Eye of the Needle'. The fort has four gates Ganesh, Hanuman, Konkan and Trimbak. The sculptures of Lord Ganesh and Hanuman are seen on the main gate.  It also has many wells on the top. The main attraction at Ratanwadi is the Amruteshwar Temple, famous for its carvings, dating back to the Hemadpant Era - roughly from the eighth century. The fort is origin for the river Pravara/Amrutvahini. The Bhandardara dam (Arthar dam) is built on this river. From the top of the fort neighbouring forts like Alang, kulang, Madan gad, Harishchandragad, Patta are seen easily. The view of entire Bhandardara dam( Lake Arthur) gives sheer pleasure. There are many rock cut water cisterns on the fort. Some of them store potable water throughout the year. There is a natural hole in the mountain top probably caused by wind erosion. It is 10 feet high and 60 feet wide. Due to its shape it is called Nedhe (or eye of the needle in Marathi).On the eastern side of the fort there are two caves, which can be used for overnight stay. This fort can be visited in any part of the year however the beast season is from October–February when the temperature is cool and the vegetation has not dried up..

History
The fort is 400 years old. Ratangad was captured by Chhatrapati Shivaji Raje Bhosle.

The fort is named after Ratnabai Tandal, who has a small temple inside the cave on the fort.

She was one of the three sisters : Ratnabai, Kalsubai and Katrabai.

How to reach
There are two main routes to reach the fort. One route starts from village Samrad and the other from village Ratanwadi. The base village Ratanwadi is approached by boat from Bhandardara or by road from Ghoti-Bhandardara road. By boat, it is a 6 km journey and further it is a 4 km walk till Ratanwadi. The trek route from Ratanwadi is the simplest one, it passes through dense forest along the northern bank of the Pravara river, till it reaches a scarp. The final climb is made easy by the iron ladders constructed by the forest department. The local villagers on weekends, erect small shacks on the way to provide tea and snacks for the trekkers. Some villagers provide food and snacks on the fort cave also. The trek route from village Samrad is quite difficult one, it passes over the narrow spur and finally reaches the Trymbak darwaja. The entire fort can be seen by taking a path which moves around the ridge of the fort. A small group of people can make an overnight stay in the cave on the fort.

Image gallery

See also 
 Govind Rao Khare

References

2. Gadkot - Bhagwan Chile, Shivsparsha Prakashan, Kolhapur

External links
 Travelogues: Trek to Ratangad
 Trek to Ratangad and Bhandardara
 
 

Forts in Maharashtra
Ahmednagar district